Zbigniew Lubiejewski (born 6 November 1949) is a Polish former volleyball player and coach, member of the Polish national team in 1972–1977, 1976 Olympic Champion, three–time Polish Champion.

Honours
 CEV Cup 
  1977/1978 – with AZS Olsztyn
 National championships
 1969/1970  Polish Cup, with AZS Olsztyn
 1970/1971  Polish Cup, with AZS Olsztyn
 1971/1972  Polish Cup, with AZS Olsztyn
 1972/1973  Polish Championship, with AZS Olsztyn
 1975/1976  Polish Championship, with AZS Olsztyn
 1977/1978  Polish Championship, with AZS Olsztyn

External links
 
 
 Player profile at Volleybox.net

1949 births
Living people
People from Bartoszyce
Polish men's volleyball players
Olympic volleyball players of Poland
Volleyball players at the 1976 Summer Olympics
Olympic medalists in volleyball
Olympic gold medalists for Poland
Medalists at the 1976 Summer Olympics
Polish expatriate sportspeople in Belgium